CUSO is an abbreviation with several meanings:

 CUSO Cuso International, originally Canadian University Service Overseas, a Canadian non-profit development organization
 Champaign-Urbana Symphony Orchestra
 Credit union service organization, a type of credit union subsidiary
 , Copper(II) sulfate